Trapped by the London Sharks is a 1916 British silent drama film directed by  L.C. MacBean and starring Humberston Wright, Blanche Forsythe and Bertram Burleigh.

Cast
 Humberston Wright as John Manton  
 Blanche Forsythe as Hilda Manton  
 Bertram Burleigh as Inspector James Graham  
 Maud Yates as Countess Zena  
 Hugh Nicolson as Baron Slomann

References

Bibliography
 Palmer, Scott. British Film Actors' Credits, 1895-1987. McFarland, 1998.

External links
 

1916 films
1916 drama films
British drama films
British silent feature films
Films set in London
British black-and-white films
1910s English-language films
1910s British films
Silent drama films